Gilmer is an extinct town in Klickitat County, in the U.S. state of Washington. The GNIS classifies it as a populated place.

A post office called Gilmer was established in 1883, and remained in operation until 1919. George W. Gilmer, an early postmaster, gave the community his name.

References

Ghost towns in Washington (state)
Geography of Klickitat County, Washington